An umbrella organization is an association of (often related, industry-specific) institutions who work together formally to coordinate activities and/or pool resources. In business, political, and other environments, it provides resources and often identities to the smaller organizations. In this kind of arrangement, it is sometimes responsible, to some degree, for the groups under its care.

Examples 

 AFL–CIO and other national trade union centers
 DD172
 Department of Public Safety
 European Armenian Federation for Justice and Democracy
 European Music Council
 European Federation for Welding, Joining and Cutting (EWF)
 Federation of Poles in Great Britain
 Federation of Student Islamic Societies
 Independent Sector
 National Retail Federation
 National Wrestling Alliance
 Open Source Geospatial Foundation
 Software in the Public Interest
 UEFA
 Ulster Defence Association
United Way
 Yamaguchi-gumi
 National Federation of Coffee Growers of Colombia

Asia

Bangladesh
 Hefazat-e-Islam Bangladesh

Europe

Russia
 The former KGB

United Kingdom
 UK BIM Alliance
 Transport for London
 Maritime UK

North America
 Canadian GeoAlliance
 Canadian Hockey League
 Central Intelligence Agency
 Jewish Federations of North America
 Metropolitan Toronto School Board and its six boards
 United Fund for the Arts and Humanities
 United States Geospatial Intelligence Foundation

Global
 International Co-operative Alliance
 International Federation of Organic Agriculture Movements
 Girls on the Run

See also
 Big tent
 Federation
 Supraorganization
 Umbrella brand
 Umbrella company
 Umbrella fund
 Umbrella school
 Umbrella term

References

External links
 

 
Types of organization